The Port Said Railway was a narrow gauge railway with a gauge of 750 mm from Ismailia to Port Said in Egypt.

History 

The construction of the narrow gauge railway along the Suez Canal was endorsed in 1891. It was mainly used for passenger transport, while goods were transported in barges on the canal. The railway was taken-over in 1902 by the Egyptian National Railways and regauged to standard gauge in 1904. The narrow gauge locomotives were sold to the Egyptian Delta Light Railways.

Locomotives

References

750 mm gauge railways in Egypt
Railway lines in Egypt